The Hatteras Indians were a tribe of Native Americans in the United States who lived in the North Carolina Outer Banks. They inhabited a village on what is now called Hatteras Island called Croatoan.

Name 
The name Hatteras was first used by the English explorer John Lawson. Lawson was writing a book where he mentioned the Hatteras Indians for the first time. Although the meaning of Hatteras is unknown, the people from that island were known as "the people of shallow water". John Lawson believed that they may have been the Croatans.

History 
The Hatteras first had contact with English settlers, notably John White, in 1587, and were gone by the mid-18th century. 

In 1701, their population was estimated to be 80 people. During the 1711 Tuscarora War, the Hatteras Indians sided with the colonists and fought against the Tuscarora tribe and their allies for the colonists. This cost them heavily and many were driven from their lands by enemy tribes.

Some descendants of the Hatteras Indians may be part of the Lumbee Indians.

Language 
The Hatteras Indians spoke a language in the Algonquian language family.

Notes

References 
 

Indigenous peoples of the Southeastern Woodlands
Eastern Algonquian peoples
Extinct Native American tribes
Native American history of North Carolina
Native American tribes in North Carolina